Lucy Hockings is a New Zealand news presenter for the BBC, moderator, events host and media trainer.

Her roles include anchoring Live with Lucy Hockings on BBC World News.

Early life, education and early career
Hockings was born on 7 April 1975 in Taranaki on New Zealand's North Island. She has a degree in journalism from the University of Auckland. Prior to joining the BBC, Hockings worked as a reporter for TVNZ.

BBC

First months
Hockings joined the BBC as a producer in 1999, before being promoted to senior producer in 2000.

Reporter
As a reporter, Hockings has covered the September 11 attacks, the Afghanistan and Iraq wars, the 2004 tsunami, the death of Pope John Paul II, the 2005 London bombings and the capture of Saddam Hussein.

Accent
During her earlier presenting days, Hockings claimed her employers made attempts to "iron out" her accent, and that she was sent to the Royal Academy of Dramatic Art for "unsuccessful" elocution lessons.

In February 2023, it was announced Hockings would become a chief presenter on the BBC’s new news channel for both UK and international viewers due to launch in April.

Films
Hockings appeared as a news anchor in the 2018 film Black Panther.

References

External links
BBC Press Office biography (archived at the Internet Archive)
 Lucy Hockings on Twitter

1970s births
Living people
Alumni of RADA
BBC newsreaders and journalists
BBC World News
Broadcast news analysts
New Zealand television journalists
New Zealand women journalists
People from Taranaki
University of Auckland alumni
British women television journalists
British radio presenters
British women radio presenters
New Zealand radio presenters
New Zealand women radio presenters